Sultan Mohammad Mahakuttah Abdulla Kiram was the 34th Sultan of Sulu (1974–1986). He was the eldest son of Sultan Mohammed Esmail Kiram I and the heir apparent to the throne. He was the last Sultan of Sulu officially recognised by the Philippine government.

In Memorandum Order 427 (1974), then-Philippine President Ferdinand Marcos declared that Mahakuttah A. Kiram was the legitimate heir and that the government was obligated to support his coronation as Sultan of Sulu, which took place on 24 May 1974. At the same time, his oldest son Muedzul Lail Tan Kiram was crowned beside his father as Raja Muda (Crown Prince) of Sulu at eight years old.

Sultan Kiram died in 1986. After the death of Sultan Kiram, the Philippine national government failed to formally recognise a new Sultan. Mahakutta's Crown Prince Muedzul Lail Kiram, the heir to the throne according to the line of succession as recognised by the Philippine governments from 1915 to 1986, was 20 years old upon his father's death. Due to his young age, he failed to claim the throne in a time of political instability in the Philippines that led to the peaceful revolution and subsequent removal of President Marcos. The gap in the Sultanate leadership was filled by crown claimants of rival branches. Therefore, the following Sultans were not crowned with the support of the Philippine government nor received a formal recognition from the national government as their predecessors had until 1986.

References

Year of birth missing
1986 deaths
Sultans of Sulu
People from Sulu
Filipino datus, rajas and sultans
Filipino Muslims
Tausūg people